Metview is a meteorological workstation and batch system developed at the European Centre for Medium-Range Weather Forecasts.

History 
Developments were started at ECMWF in 1990 in co-operation with the National Institute for Space Research of Brazil and Météo-France.

Features

User interface 

Metview has an icon based user interface, where any aspect of a meteorological (graphical) product is expressed in an icon. Users can prototype visualisation by dragging and dropping icons in the plot area.

Metview offers also various tools to explore and display the content of meteorological file formats, such as GRIB, BUFR, NetCDF and ODB.

Metview Macro language for batch processing 
The Macro language is designed to be high level to allow analysts and scientist to concentrate on the work/processing flow they try to achieve.
# Metview Macro

# reading GRIB files through the read() function
a = read(mygrib1.grb)
b = read(mygrib2.grb)

# calculating the differences between two fields 
c = a-b

# plotting the result
plot(c)
In 2017 a Python version of the macro language was developed.

Supported file formats 
Metview supports the various meteorological data formats as input and output formats: GRIB (editions 1 and 2), BUFR, NetCDF, ODB (ECMWF Observation Database), Local databases and ASCII data files (Comma-separated values, grids and scattered data)

Development 

All major developments are made at the Development Section at ECMWF. Most of the code is in C++ and the code is versioned in git. CMake is used as build system.

Metview makes use of other software packages developed at ECMWF. In fact Metview is an extended MARS client and uses ecCodes for GRIB and BUFR handling and Magics for contouring and visualisation.

Distribution 

Metview is mainly distributed as a source tarball under the Apache License version 2.0. There are plans to distribute the code on GitHub.

Binary versions of Metview are available in conda (through the conda-forge channel), in Ubuntu and MacPorts. RPMs for major Linux distribution are provided on the Open Build Service.

References

External links
 

Graphic software in meteorology
Science software